Taractrocera nigrolimbata is a butterfly of the family Hesperiidae. It is found in Malaysia, Vietnam (Saigon), Sumatra, Java, the Lesser Sunda Islands (east to Sumba), and southern Sulawesi.

Subspecies
Taractrocera nigrolimbata nigrolimbata (Indochina to Java)
Taractrocera nigrolimbata talanta (Plötz, 1885) (eastern Java, Lesser Sunda Islands and southern Sulawesi)

External links
Phylogeny and biogeography of the genus Taractrocera Butler, 1870 (Lepidoptera: Hesperiidae), an example of Southeast Asian-Australian interchange

Taractrocerini
Butterflies described in 1876
Butterflies of Asia
Taxa named by Pieter Cornelius Tobias Snellen